KSLZ (107.7 FM "Z107-7") is a Top 40 (CHR) radio station in St. Louis, Missouri, United States. The iHeartMedia (previously Clear Channel Communications) outlet broadcasts at 107.7 MHz with an ERP of 100 kW. Its transmitter is located in Shrewsbury, a suburb of St. Louis, and operates from studios in St. Louis south of Forest Park.

History

1968-1979: Early Years 
107.7 FM debuted on the air in 1968 as KACO, which aired an adult contemporary/Middle of the Road format until a fire took the station off the air in January 1970. Two months later, the station returned to the air and changed call letters to KGRV, "Music for Groovy Adults," offering a more upbeat AC format, which lasted until 1972, when it once again changed call letters to KKSS, "Kiss 108", but retained its AC format. By 1974, KKSS switched formats to country. A year later, KKSS switched formats to an R&B format dubbed "Black in Stereo". In February 1979, KKSS altered its R&B format and adopted the moniker "Studio 108," with a hybrid Disco/R&B format, competing with WZEN (now KATZ-FM).

1979-1997: Urban 
In June 1979, the calls were changed to KMJM, and the station rebranded as "The New Majic 108 FM, The Music Is The Majic!" KMJM Really wanted to cater to both the Black and White audiences as the St. Louis market's first ever "CHUrban" station (a forerunner to the Rhythmic Contemporary format). The station was owned by Keymarket Communications at the time. KMJM would later go on to be among the top 5 stations in the St. Louis Arbitrons during the 1980s, even as they shifted towards a conventional Urban Contemporary direction. In May 1988, KMJM was sold to Noble Communications of San Diego for $19 million. KMJM's signal was one of the best in the St. Louis area, and at the time, the station emerged as the Top R&B/Urban station in the market.  Jacor bought the station in late 1997, but the new owners were not interested in keeping "Majic" on the frequency despite its longterm success.

1997-present: Top 40 
On October 20, 1997, at Midnight, after 18 years on 107.7 FM, KMJM was moved to recently purchased sister station 104.9 WCBW, which aired a Christian format. After a 12-hour stunt with a looped heartbeat and announcements redirecting KMJM listeners to the new frequency and the launch of a new format on 107.7 later that day, KSLZ and its current Top 40/CHR format, branded as "Z107-7", debuted. The flip was to fill a format hole left by WKBQ, who dropped the format for Modern AC in February of that year. The final song on "Majic" was "Good Girls" by Joe, while the first song on "Z" was "Get Ready For This" by 2 Unlimited. 

At first, KSLZ was the St. Louis affiliate for the MJ Morning Show, based at Tampa sister station WFLZ, and the only affiliate for the show outside of the Eastern Time Zone. After the show ended in February 2012, KSLZ became the St. Louis affiliate for The Bobby Bones Show. After Bones relaunched his show to air on country stations in February 2013, KSLZ replaced him with Elvis Duran and the Morning Show. In December 2017, KSLZ dropped Duran for local host Jordan DeSocio. As part of company-wide layoffs, DeSocio exited the station in November 2020, and was replaced by "The Jubal Show", based at Seattle sister station KBKS.

HD Radio
KSLZ made the conversion to HD Radio in 2006. 107.7-HD2 carried a New CHR format branded as "Z107-7 Amped." On June 22, 2016, KSLZ-HD2 switched to "Pride Radio".

References

External links
 Official Website
 

Radio stations established in 1968
SLZ
Contemporary hit radio stations in the United States
1968 establishments in Missouri
IHeartMedia radio stations